David Carlsson may refer to:

David Carlsson (bandy) (born 1983), Swedish bandy player for Vetlanda BK
David Carlsson (footballer) (born 1983), Swedish footballer

See also
David Karlsson (disambiguation)